Daouda Karaboué (born 11 December 1975 in Abidjan, Côte d'Ivoire) is a French handball player, he won the gold medal at the 2008 Summer Olympics, the 2009 World Championships and the 2012 Summer Olympics.

He was awarded Chevalier de la Légion d'honneur in 2008 for playing handball at the Beijing Olympics and for having 14 years of sporting activity.

References

External links 
 
 
 
 

1975 births
Living people
French male handball players
Olympic handball players of France
Olympic gold medalists for France
Olympic medalists in handball
Handball players at the 2008 Summer Olympics
Handball players at the 2012 Summer Olympics
Medalists at the 2008 Summer Olympics
Medalists at the 2012 Summer Olympics
European champions for France
Montpellier Handball players
French sportspeople of Ivorian descent
French sportspeople of Burkinabé descent
Sportspeople of Burkinabé descent
Sportspeople from Abidjan